Chung Ting is one of the 19 constituencies in the Tai Po District. The constituency returns one district councillor to the Tai Po District Council, with an election every four years. The seat was currently held by Eric Tam Wing-fun of the Business and Professionals Alliance for Hong Kong.

Chung Ting constituency is loosely based on private apartments including Fortune Plaza, Jade Plaza, Eightland Gardens in Tai Po with estimated population of 14,303.

Councillors represented

Election results

2010s

2000s

References

Tai Po
Constituencies of Hong Kong
Constituencies of Tai Po District Council
1994 establishments in Hong Kong
Constituencies established in 1994